Ninong Ering (born 3 January 1959) is an Indian politician belonging to the Indian National Congress. He represented the Arunachal East (Lok Sabha constituency) in Lok Sabha, the lower house of Indian Parliament from 2009 to 2019. He was the Union Minister of State for Minority Affairs from 2012 to 2014.

Political career
Ering was a member of the Arunachal Pradesh Legislative Assembly representing Pasighat East constituency as an independent candidate from 1990–1995. In 1995, he again contested from the same constituency as an independent candidate, but he was defeated by the Congress candidate Tobar Jamoh. From 1999-2004 he again became a member of the Arunachal Pradesh Legislative Assembly representing the same constituency as a Congress candidate. From 1999–2002, he was the Minister of State of the Government of Arunachal Pradesh and from 2002–2004, he was the Deputy Speaker of the Arunachal Pradesh Legislative Assembly. In 2009, he was elected to the 15th Lok Sabha, where he was a Member of the Standing Committee on Science & Technology, Environment & Forests and a Member of the Consultative Committee, Ministry of Civil Aviation. He was re-elected to 16th Lok Sabha from the same constituency in 2014 and again served as member of the Standing Committee on Science & Technology, Environment & Forests and the Consultative Committee, Ministry of Petroleum and Natural Gas.

Introduction of The Menstruation Benefit Bill, 2017 
Ninong Ering moved a Private Members’ Bill, ‘The Menstruation Benefit Bill, 2017’, which proposed that women working in the public and private sectors get two days of paid menstrual leave every month. The Bill also sought to provide better facilities for rest at the workplace during menstruation. The bill triggered a nationwide debate and brought India in the list of countries like Italy, South Korea, Japan where the law existed or was debated. Ering also asked a question on whether the government has any plan to propose menstrual leave at the workplace. In its reply, the Ministry of Women and Child Development said there was no such proposal and also the ministry did not have any plan for a legislation on the issue. The Ministry, however, listed a number of awareness efforts for adolescent girls.  Ninong Ering in his interview to The BloombergQuint congratulated his entire team and thanked his PRS Legislative Research LAMP Fellows for working on the bill.  This initiative gained a nationwide support and Ninong Ering received applause from a number of women activists organisations.

Criticism of Swami Ramdev
On 19 February 2011, Ninong Ering allegedly criticised the anti-corruption drive of Indian religious leader Swami Ramdev and referred to him as a "bloody dog". The Bharatiya Janata Party criticised the remarks, stating that Ramdev was a revered figure and further if  Mr. Ering did not consider himself to be Indian then he should excuse himself from the Indian Parliament. The Congress party claimed that it had asked for explanation from Ering on this matter.

Personal life
Ering belongs to the Adi tribe and is a member of the Evangelical North Eastern Hill Church Council of Arunachal Pradesh. He has four children, two daughters and two sons, and he is the son of the late Shri Daying Ering and Smt. Odam Ering.

References

External links
 Official biographical sketch in Parliament of India website

India MPs 2009–2014
Indian National Congress politicians
Indian National Congress politicians from Arunachal Pradesh
Living people
1959 births
Indian evangelicals
People from East Siang district
Lok Sabha members from Arunachal Pradesh
People from Pasighat
India MPs 2014–2019
People from Adi Community
Arunachal Pradesh MLAs 1990–1995
Arunachal Pradesh MLAs 1999–2004